The 2020–21 Wichita State Shockers men's basketball team represented Wichita State University in the 2020–21 NCAA Division I men's basketball season. They played their home games at Charles Koch Arena in Wichita, Kansas and were led by interim head coach Isaac Brown who took over as interim coach after Gregg Marshall resigned before the start of the season. Brown was promoted to full-time head coach during the season. They are members of the American Athletic Conference. They finished the season 16–6, 11–2 in AAC Play to finish in 1st place. They defeated South Florida in the quarterfinals of the AAC tournament before losing in the semifinals to Cincinnati. They received an at large-bid to the NCAA tournament where they lost in the First Four to Drake.

Previous season
The Shockers finished the 2019–20 season 23–8, 11–7 in AAC play and finished in fourth place. They entered as the No. 4 seed in the AAC tournament, which was ultimately cancelled due to the coronavirus pandemic.

Departures

Morris Udeze initially entered the transfer portal in March before deciding in late April to remain with the Shockers.

2020 recruiting class

Incoming transfers

Preseason

AAC preseason media poll

On October 28, The American released the preseason Poll and other preseason awards.

Roster

Schedule and results

COVID-19 impact

Due to the ongoing COVID-19 pandemic, the Shockers' schedule is subject to change, including the cancellation or postponement of individual games, the cancellation of the entire season, or games played either with minimal fans or without fans in attendance and just essential personnel.

The Shockers were scheduled to participate in the 2020 Crossover Classic, but withdrew after multiple players tested positive for COVID-19.
After the East Carolina game was postponed, December 30th was filled with a non-conference game vs. Newman.
The game at East Carolina scheduled for February 21st was moved to Wichita.

Schedule

|-
!colspan=12 style=| Regular season

|-
!colspan=12 style=| American Conference tournament
|-

|-
!colspan=12 style=| NCAA tournament
|-

Awards and honors

American Athletic Conference honors

All-AAC Awards
Player of the Year: Tyson Etienne
Coach of the Year: Isaac Brown

All-AAC First Team
Tyson Etienne

All-AAC Third Team
Alterique Gilbert

All-AAC Freshman Team
Ricky Council IV

Source

References

Wichita State Shockers men's basketball seasons
Wichita State
Shock
Wichita State